Rue d'Aerschot (French) or Aarschotstraat (Dutch) is a street in the Schaerbeek municipality of Brussels, Belgium. It is known as a hotspot of the city's underground nightlife and famous for its brothels. The street is also known for its inexpensive lodging.

Rue d'Aerschot is close to Brussels' city centre, and is adjacent to the financial and business district, where the Brussels World Trade Center is located. The street is located on the edge of the Turkish Quarter, and next to Brussels-North Station, one of the three main train stations in Brussels. The station's buildings and tracks occupy the whole western side of the street. The rear entrance of the neoclassical Church of Saints John and Nicholas is also located on the street.

History
Rue d'Aerschot was built around 1839 when the North Station was constructed and the surrounding streets developed. The station was originally called Gare de Cologne, and the street Rue de Cologne.

After World War I, due to strong anti-German feelings in Belgium, many streets which were named after German towns or cities were renamed. The street was renamed Rue d'Aerschot after the town in Brabant which had suffered heavily in the conflict.

The station was rebuilt in 1953 and renamed Gare du Nord. Following the Brussels World's Fair in 1958, a major plan was devised to rebuild the Northern Quarter – the so-called "Manhattan Project". Work started to the west of the station, including the World Trade Center, in the 1960s. Bankruptcy in the early 1970s prevented the implementation of the scheme to the east of the station, including Rue d'Aerschot.

Prostitution

Prostitution in the Rue d'Aerschot is known to have existed before World War I. In modern times, it has become the main red-light district in Brussels and has many "windows" that scantily dressed prostitutes sit in trying to attract trade. Most of the girls are Romanian or Bulgarian.

In the 1990s, the area was controlled by Albanian pimps. There was often violence between rival pimps and girls complained to the police that the pimps were abusing and exploiting them. There was a crackdown and the criminal networks were broken down.

The area is now controlled by Romanian and Bulgarian pimps. Each window has a madam who controls the prostitutes that work there. The madam takes 50% of the prostitute's earnings. Madams were traditionally older Belgian prostitutes but these have been replaced with mainly Bulgarian women who work for the pimps. This allows the pimps to stay out of the area and away from police attention. Often they remain in their home country.

Although widely tolerated by police and local authorities, this neighbourhood has at times been a target of joint government/police efforts to track down human trafficking operatives, mostly aimed at breaking up criminal networks that lure young women from central and eastern European countries with the promise of a better life in Western Europe.

Non-profit associations also operate in the area, mainly women's groups providing support and counseling to prostitutes.

See also

 List of streets in Brussels
 Prostitution in Belgium
 Red-light districts in Belgium

References

Aerschotrue
Red-light districts in Belgium
Prostitution in Belgium